The 1939 All-Big Ten Conference football team consists of American football players selected to the All-Big Ten Conference teams selected by the Associated Press (AP) and United Press (UP) for the 1939 Big Ten Conference football season.

All Big-Ten selections

Ends
 Esco Sarkkinen, Ohio State (AP-1; UP-1)
 Dave Rankin, Purdue (AP-2; UP-1)
 Erwin Prasse, Iowa (AP-1)
 John Mariucci, Minnesota (AP-2)

Tackles
 Jim Reeder, Illinois (AP-1; UP-1)
 Mike Enich, Iowa (AP-2; UP-1)
 Win Pedersen, Minnesota (AP-1)
 Nick Cutlich, Northwestern (AP-2)

Guards
 Hal Method, Northwestern (AP-1; UP-1)
 Frank Bykowski, Purdue (UP-1)
 Vic Marino, Ohio State (AP-1)
 Mel Brewer, Illinois (AP-2)
 James Logan, Indiana (AP-2)

Centers
 John Haman, Northwestern (AP-1; UP-1)
 Steve Andrako, Ohio State (AP-2)

Quarterbacks
 Don Scott, Ohio State (AP-1; UP-1)
 Forest Evashevski, Michigan (AP-2)

Halfbacks
 Tom Harmon, Michigan (AP-1; UP-1) (1940 Heisman Trophy winner)
 Nile Kinnick, Iowa (AP-1; UP-1) (1939 Heisman Trophy winner)
 Hal Van Every, Minnesota (AP-2)
 George Franck, Minnesota (AP-2)
 Jim Strausbaugh, Ohio State (AP-2)

Fullbacks
 George Paskvan, Wisconsin (AP-1; UP-1)
 Jim Langhurst, Ohio State (AP-2)

Key

AP = Associated Press, chosen by conference coaches

UP = United Press: "Coaches, scouts, players, campus correspondents and sports editors in every Big Ten center, participating in one of the most thorough investigations of football talent ever attempted in the midwest"

Bold = Consensus first-team selection of both the AP and UP

See also
1939 College Football All-America Team

References

1939 Big Ten Conference football season
All-Big Ten Conference football teams